Conn Ó Catháin was Bishop of Raphoe.

Ó Catháin was bishop from 6 February 1514, and accepted royal supremacy of King Henry VIII in 1534. Ó Catháin died in or after 1550.

Notes

16th-century Roman Catholic bishops in Ireland
Roman Catholic bishops of Raphoe